is a horror manga written and illustrated by . It made its first appearance in the 1990s as a feature for Palace of Fear before its commercial release on the Leed Publishing Co. label.

Plot 
Octopus Girl is made-up of a series of vignettes about the titular character Takoko (Called Tako by her classmates) who is regularly bullied by her classmates. They take things too far one day and attempt to drown her, then force her to eat a live octopus, which she is allergic to. Both almost kill her. However, she wakes up that night with the body of an octopus but the head of a girl. She then brutally gets revenge on the bullies. She later figures out how to control her transformations.

External links 
Dark Horse Comics; Octopus Girl website
 

Comedy anime and manga
Horror anime and manga
1994 manga
Dark Horse Comics titles